Taqdeer may refer to:

Taqdeer (1943 film), a 1943 Indian Bollywood film
Taqdeer (1983 film), a 1983 Hindi-language Indian film directed by Brij
Taqdeer (2022 TV series), a Pakistani TV show broadcast by ARY Digital
Taqdeer (TV series), a Bengali web series
Taqdir, an Islamic concept relating to the tension between free-will and omnipotence

See also